Leopold is a small unincorporated community in Leopold Township, Perry County, in the U.S. state of Indiana.

With a population of less than 100, Leopold is the site of a Roman Catholic church, St. Augustine; a general store, Guillaume's Store; a restaurant, Marcy's; and a quiet atmosphere reminiscent of another time. On the last Sunday in July, Leopold holds its annual St. Augustine's picnic, which serves both as a fundraiser for the local parish and as a homecoming for former residents.

History
Leopold was founded in 1842 by the Reverend Augustine Bessonies and named for the then-reigning king of Belgium, Leopold I.

A post office has been in operation at Leopold since 1846.

Most of the original settlers of Leopold were Belgian emigres. These "lorrain" settlers were Catholics from the French-speaking southern region of Belgium which had formerly been part of Luxembourg. They were motivated to move to America from cities along the Meuse River bordering France, such as Florenville and Chiny, after Belgium was placed under Protestant rule in the 1830s. The land and climate of Perry County was similar to their homeland and made for an easier transition. Because this was an open frontier, immigrants were required to sign an oath renouncing any allegiance to King Leopold.

Geography

References

Belgian-American history
Unincorporated communities in Perry County, Indiana
Unincorporated communities in Indiana